

Jean-Dominique Bauby
French journalist Jean-Dominique Bauby suffered a stroke in December 1995. When he awoke 20 days later, he found his body was almost completely paralyzed; he could control only his left eyelid (as the other was sewn shut to prevent an infection). By blinking this eye, he slowly dictated one alphabetic character at a time and, in so doing, was able over a great length of time to write his memoir, The Diving Bell and the Butterfly; the memoir was adapted to the screen in a namesake 2007 movie. Two days after the book was published in March 1997, Bauby died from pneumonia. He was instrumental in forming the Association du Locked in Syndrome (ALIS) in France.

Nick Chisholm
Nick Chisholm (born 1973 in Dunedin, New Zealand), the brother of Survivor NZ host Matt Chisholm, suffered a series of mini-strokes, culminating in a massive brainstem stroke during a rugby game at the age of 27 on 29 July 2000. He has since recovered some muscle usage, and has become a bodybuilder and a personal trainer for other disabled people. He can't speak, but communicates via pointedly moving his eyes around a clear plastic board with letters and number on it to spell out what he wants to say. On March 26, 2020, his wife Nicola gave birth to triplets, conceived with Nick via IVF.

Rom Houben
In 1983, Rom Houben survived a near-fatal car crash and was diagnosed as being in a vegetative state. Twenty-three years later, using "modern brain imaging techniques and equipment", doctors revised his diagnosis to locked-in syndrome. He was initially reported as communicating by typing into a keyboard with his right hand, though the presence of a facilitator to move his hand attracted sharp criticism and strong doubts that Houben's communications were authentic.

In early 2010, Dr. Steven Laureys, Houben's neurologist, admitted that subsequent tests had demonstrated Houben had not actually been communicating via the facilitator, and Der Spiegel, which had originally "quoted" many of Houben's facilitated statements, retracted those quotes as being inauthentic.  Laureys maintained the MRI data that had led him to diagnose Houben as locked-in still suggested he was conscious.

Houben's case had been thought to call into question the current methods of diagnosing vegetative state and arguments against withholding care from such patients.

Tony Nicklinson
Tony Nicklinson was born on 2 April 1954. Nicklinson was a rugby union player and a successful civil engineer. The 58 year old was paralyzed from the neck down after having a stroke in 2005. He was not able to speak or move any parts of his body apart from his head and eyes. He had spent two-and-a-half years undergoing therapy in a hospital before moving home in a wheelchair to be cared for by his wife, Jane, and his two teenage daughters Lauren and Beth. He described his life as a "living nightmare".

Nicklinson attempted to seek a landmark ruling in the British courts which would have allowed him the right to an assisted death, but he lost the case in the High Court. He died on 20 August 2012 at his home in Melksham, Wiltshire by refusing food. His family continued his case after his death, before it was ultimately rejected in the Supreme Court.

Gary Parkinson
In 2010, former Premiership footballer Gary Parkinson suffered a massive stroke and was later diagnosed with locked-in syndrome. This, however, has not ended his career in football, as he is now part of Middlesbrough F.C.'s scouting analysis team, watching potential players on DVD and relaying the verdict to the Middlesbrough manager Tony Mowbray solely through blinking.

Martin Pistorius
Martin Pistorius began developing locked-in syndrome when he was 12 years old. He went into a coma for two to three years, after which point he slowly regained consciousness but was unable to communicate this to others until he was around 19 years of age. Now capable of some movement and able to communicate with a speech synthesizer, Pistorius currently works as a freelance web designer/developer and has published a book about his life entitled Ghost Boy.

Tony Quan, aka Tempt One
Tony Quan, a popular graffiti artist, was diagnosed with the nerve disorder ALS in 2003, which eventually left him fully paralyzed except for his eyes. Quan uses the technology called EyeWriter to communicate his art and has since had his work displayed in numerous art shows nationally.

Cases in literature

The Count of Monte Cristo
The character of M. Noirtier de Villefort in Alexandre Dumas' novel The Count of Monte Cristo (1844) apparently suffers from locked-in syndrome. He is described as a "corpse with living eyes", who communicates with eye movements and expressions. His granddaughter Valentine helps him form sentences by reciting the alphabet and scanning dictionary pages with her finger until he indicates which letters and words he wants.

A Song of Ice and Fire
In the first novel A Game of Thrones, the character Khal Drogo succumbs into a vegetative state after suffering sepsis countered by blood magic, resulting in complete paralysis. Though he is able to move his eyes along the orbit of the sun, he is implied to be blind and only able to sense it because of the heat. His wife, Daenerys, ultimately suffocates him out of pity.

Thérèse Raquin
In Émile Zola's novel Thérèse Raquin (1867), Thérèse Raquin and her second husband Laurent accidentally reveal to Thérèse's aunt, Madame Raquin (who has suffered from locked-in syndrome after a stroke), that they have murdered Camille Raquin (Madame Raquin's son). One day, when some friends are over, Madame Raquin eventually musters an enormous amount of strength to move her finger on a table, tracing words that would reveal Thérèse and Laurent's deed. However, she is interrupted, and her words are misinterpreted as "Thérèse and Laurent have taken good care of me".

Johnny Got His Gun
Johnny Got His Gun (1938) is a novel by American author and screenwriter Dalton Trumbo, which describes a young American soldier who loses both his arms, his legs, and his face in World War I. This novel portrays "how it might feel to be totally locked-in", but it is not a true case of "locked-in syndrome", according to the WHO definition. Johnny attempts to communicate with the outside world using Morse code through banging his head on his pillow and weakly chanting (in his mind) "SOS Help me".

The Ultimate Secret
The character of Jean-Louis Martin in Bernard Werber's sci-fi novel L'Ultime Secret (2001), suffers from locked-in syndrome after being paralyzed in a car accident. Able at first only communicate by blinking – once for "Yes" and twice for "No" – with the use of high tech, he eventually gains control not only over his own mind, but those of others.

Locked In
Sharon McCone, the protagonist of Marcia Muller's suspense novel Locked In (2009), is the founder of a successful San Francisco detective agency. On returning to her office late one night, she is shot in the head. She wakes up in a hospital able to move only her eyes, forced to struggle to rehabilitate herself while finding the attacker.

Sleepyhead
Mark Billingham's novel Sleepyhead (2013) addresses a criminal who purposely manipulates pressure points on each victim's head and neck with the intention of inducing locked-in syndrome.

The Diving Bell and the Butterfly

The book The Diving Bell and the Butterfly is a memoir by journalist Jean-Dominique Bauby. It describes what his life is like after suffering a massive stroke that left him with locked-in syndrome. It also details what his life was like before the stroke.

Lock In
John Scalzi's science fiction police procedural Lock In is based on a society where large numbers have the locked-in-like Haden's Syndrome due to a pandemic, and are able to interact with the world through BCI-controlled bodies.

Lamikorda
In D. R. Merrill's 2014 science-fiction novel, the Alplai virologist and epidemiologist Gihuunak appears to have a form of locked-in syndrome, being confined to a motorized wheelchair and using a speech synthesizer to communicate.

Cases in popular culture

The 100
In season 6, episode 4 of The 100, titled "The Face Behind the Glass", the main character (Clarke Griffin) is shot in the neck with a paralytic dart, resulting in a locked-in state in which she was able to move only her eyes voluntarily.

Alfred Hitchcock Presents
In season 1, episode 7 of Alfred Hitchcock Presents, titled "Breakdown" (November 13, 1955, on CBS), the sole survivor of a violent collision (Joseph Cotten) finds himself in a locked-in state, unable even to move an eyelid. The viewer experiences the victim's point of view, "hearing" his thoughts and feelings as they run from shock to anger to frustration to the realization that he may be put in his grave alive.

Breaking Bad
Hector Salamanca, a character on Breaking Bad and Better Call Saul, was left paralyzed after having a stroke. Initially unable to move any part of his body, he later gained use of his right index finger and rang a bell attached to his wheelchair to communicate.

Criminal Minds
In the Criminal Minds episode "The Uncanny Valley", the unsub Samantha Malcolm induces locked-in syndrome using a series of drugs in three women. Her reason is she is trying to complete a series of dolls she lost as a young girl. Every two months, a woman will die as the stress wreaks havoc on the body. Only one woman, who has diabetes, is able to counteract the drugs and fight off her locked-in syndrome. The episode "To Bear Witness" also uses locked-in syndrome; in it a man falls into locked-in syndrome after surviving a botched lobotomy and communicates to Derek (Shemar Moore) through blinks.

CSI: New York
The CSI: NY episode "Blink" presented an instance of locked-in syndrome wherein a woman (portrayed by Jewel Christian) was sedated by the killer, who applied pressure to certain points on her head, resulting in her paralysis. The killer's previous attempts resulted in his victims' dying.

Forever
In the Forever episode "The Last Death of Henry Morgan," Henry confronts his immortal stalker, Adam, and lures Adam close enough to plunge a needle into his neck and inject a full syringe of air.  We later see Adam now has Locked-In Syndrome from an air embolism to his brainstem.  The scene is from Adam's point of view, the image out of focus and voices mildly distorted.  The doctor tells Henry Adam's condition could last a lifetime - the only way to stop Adam killing mortals and tormenting Henry will be to keep him alive in this state.

House M.D.
The House M.D. episode "Locked In" presented a case of locked-in syndrome, which later turned into a case of total locked-in syndrome; the patient was portrayed by Mos Def.

Scrubs
In the Scrubs episode "His Story III", a patient (played by Henry LeBlanc) is presented with locked-in syndrome.

Star Trek
In the Star Trek episode "The Menagerie", Star Fleet captain Christopher Pike (played by Jeffrey Hunter when healthy, and Sean Kenney when injured) is severely burned, completely paralyzed, and can communicate only by brain waves; he can operate an electrical wheelchair and can answer yes/no questions by "one flash for yes, two flashes for no".  This episode aired in November 1966; the first actual such interface was done by Fetz at the University of Washington in 1969, as noted in brain–computer interface.

TED Talks
On the TED Talk website a talk was posted about the story of one family's journey with a brainstem stroke called: "My Father, Locked-in his Body but Soaring Free". Another talk was given about graffiti artist TEMPT and the open source eye tracking device that was developed for him by his friends: "The Invention That Unlocked A Locked In Artist"

Calvary
In Calvary Dr. Frank Harte (Aidan Gillen) tells Father James (Brendan Gleeson) a story about a small child rendered deaf, mute, paralyzed and blind after botched anaesthesia, and contemplates the ineffable terror of such sensory isolation.

References

People with brain injuries
Locked-in syndrome